In the Principality of Serbia, Kingdom of Serbia and Yugoslavia, the srez (/ срезови) was a second-level administrative unit, a district that included several town- or village municipalities. It was abolished in 1963–67 in SFR Yugoslavia. The unit is no longer used, although the katastarski srez is used in cadastral classification of property.

History
The srez was noted as a second-level administrative unit in the 1903 Constitution of Serbia and the 1921 Constitution of Yugoslavia, below the okrug and above the opština.

See also
Administrative divisions of Yugoslavia
Uyezd, historical Russian equivalent

References

Sources

Subdivisions of Yugoslavia
Former types of subdivisions of Serbia
Former types of subdivisions of Bosnia and Herzegovina